The 2015 Harborough District Council election took place on 7 May 2015 to elect members of the Harborough District Council in England. It was held on the same day as other local elections.

Ward results
Sitting councillors are marked with an asterisk (*).

Billesdon

Bosworth

Broughton Astley–Astley

Broughton Astley–Broughton

Broughton Astley–Primethorpe

Broughton Astley–Sutton

Dunton

Fleckney

Glen

Kibworth

Lubenham

References

2015 English local elections
May 2015 events in the United Kingdom
2015
2010s in Leicestershire